Damla Demirdön (born 6 September 1990) is a Turkish women's football midfielder currently playing in the Turkish Women's First Football League for Ataşehir Belediyespor in Istanbul with jersey number 17. She is member of the Turkey women's national team since 2007.

Career

Club

Demirdön obtained her license for Gazi Üniversitesispor on 19 January 2005. She played for the team in her hometown until the end of 2009–10 season. She won two league championship titles with Gazi Üniversitesispor in the 2007–08 and 2009–10 seasons. She capped in total 69 times. Currently, she plays for the Istanbul-based Ataşehir Belediyespor, where she joined in the 2010–11 season. With Ataşehir, she became twice more league champion in the 2010–11 and 2011–12 seasons.

She took part at the 2011–12 UEFA Women's Champions League – Group 4, and 2012–13 UEFA Women's Champions League – Group 1 matches for Ataşehir Belediyespor.

International
Damla Demirdön was called up to the Turkey women's U-19 national team, and debuted at the friendly match against Macedonia on 22 January 2006. She participated at the UEFA Women's Under-19 Championship qualification round matches in 2007 and 2008. She capped 15 times in total for the junior women's national team until September 2008.

In 2007, Demirdön was admitted to the Turkey women's national team and played her first game against Bulgaria on 4 November 2007. She took part in three games of the UEFA Women's Euro 2013 qualifying – Group 2 games.

Career statistics
.

Honours 
 Turkish Women's First Football League
 Gazi Üniversitesispor
 Winners (2): 2007–08, 2009–10
 Third place (1): 2008–09

 Ataşehir Belediyespor
 Winners (2): 2010–11, 2011–12
 Runners-up (4): 2012–13, 2013–14, 2014–15, 2015–16

References

External links
 

Living people
1990 births
Sportspeople from Ankara
Turkish women's footballers
Turkey women's international footballers
Women's association football midfielders
Gazi Üniversitesispor players
Ataşehir Belediyespor players